Sir William Goodfellow (26 May 1880 – 5 November 1974) was a New Zealand hardware merchant, dairying industrialist, company director and philanthropist. He was born in Alexandra, Waikato, New Zealand, on 26 May 1880.

In the 1953 Coronation Honours, Goodfellow was appointed a Knight Bachelor, for service to the dairy industry. In 1994, he was an inaugural inductee into the New Zealand Business Hall of Fame.

References

1880 births
1974 deaths
Hardware merchants
New Zealand philanthropists
20th-century New Zealand businesspeople
People from Waikato
New Zealand Knights Bachelor
20th-century philanthropists